Chubar (also Romanized as Chūbar, Choobar, and Chūbor; also known as Chāhbēr) is a city in Haviq District, Talesh County, Gilan Province, Iran.  At the 2006 census, its population was 1,481, in 374 families.

Language 
Linguistic composition of the city.

References

Populated places in Talesh County

Cities in Gilan Province

Azerbaijani settlements in Gilan Province